Anthony Scully Earl (April 12, 1936 – February 23, 2023) was an American lawyer and Democratic politician who served as the 41st governor of Wisconsin from 1983 until 1987.  Prior to his election as governor, he served as secretary of the Wisconsin Department of Administration and secretary of the Wisconsin Department of Natural Resources in the administration of Governor Patrick Lucey.  He also served three terms in the Wisconsin State Assembly, representing Marathon County.

Early life and career
Earl was born in St. Ignace, Michigan, the son of Ethlynne Julia (Scully) and Russell K. Earl. He graduated from Michigan State University in 1958 and earned a J.D. from the University of Chicago. After four years in the U.S. Navy, including two years as a legal officer, Earl made his way to Wisconsin in 1965. He was the district attorney of Marathon County, Wisconsin from 1965 to 1966, and the city attorney of Wausau, Wisconsin from 1966 to 1969. That year, he was elected to the Wisconsin State Assembly, filling the seat vacated by David Obey, who was elected a member of the United States House of Representatives. 

In 1974, Earl left the Assembly to run for Wisconsin Attorney General, but was defeated in the primary by Bronson La Follette. Upon his defeat, then-Gov. Patrick Lucey named Earl secretary of the Department of Administration. Later, Earl became Secretary of the Wisconsin Department of Natural Resources (DNR) where his list of accomplishments include addressing the State's surface water pollution.

Governor of Wisconsin
In 1982, Earl ran for governor when Lee S. Dreyfus unexpectedly declined to run for re-election, and soon the Wisconsin Democratic Party's hopes of reclaiming the governor's mansion became very real. As head of the state Department of Natural Resources, Earl was well-received as a staunch defender of the environment and a problem-solver. Earl used that reputation to defeat former Acting Governor Martin J. Schreiber (1977–79) in the Democratic primary for governor. Earl went on to defeat the Republican candidate, Terry Jodok Kohler, in a landslide victory.

However, Earl's tenure as governor was a challenge from the start. By the time he took office, Wisconsin was marred by a budget deficit of nearly $1 billion and a 12% unemployment rate. Earl signed legislation making the 5%  sales tax permanent and also added a 10% surtax on state income tax which was later reduced. Once the state was fiscally sound, Earl passed initiatives improving the environment, education, and equal opportunity. Earl appointed Doris Hanson, the State's first  female to hold the office of secretary of the Department of Administration and Howard Fuller, the first African-American appointed to a cabinet position heading the Department of Employee Relations. Due to disagreements over healthcare reform, prison staffing, wage freezes, and other matters, Earl's relations with state labor Unions soured and made his tenure as governor all the more complicated.

After restoring the state following one of the worst economic predicaments in state history, Governor Earl was ousted after one term. State Assembly Minority Leader Tommy Thompson, a Republican, staunchly opposed Earl's policies and was elected in 1986 to the first of four consecutive terms. Earl Bricker wrote an essay, "goodbye to Wisconsin Governor Tony Earl" bemoaning that Tommy Thompson had defeated Earl in the 1986 election, and that is "pro-family" stance may have given him wider demographic appeal than Earl's defense of gay and lesbian rights.

Post-gubernatorial career
Earl served on the governing board of "Common Cause Wisconsin" from 1995 until 2005. a non-partisan, non-profit citizen's lobby affiliated with national Common Cause. In 1990, Earl was elected to the Common Cause National Governing Board and served until 1996. CC/WI promotes campaign finance reform, ethics and lobby reform, open meetings laws, voting rights, non-partisan redistricting, and other issues concerning the promotion and maintenance of accountable government. Earl also served on the board of the Chicago-based Joyce Foundation for many years until 2013.

In July 2004, Earl was recognized at the 12th Annual Outreach Awards for his acknowledgment of the needs of the gay and lesbian community during his term in office; he received the organization's Political Courage Award. He served on the board of directors of the American Transmission Company which assumed ownership, operation, planning, maintenance, and monitoring of all the electrical transmission assets formerly owned by a number of Wisconsin utility companies, cooperatives, and municipal utilities. He was a past partner in one of the largest law firms (more than 400 lawyers) in Wisconsin, Quarles and Brady.
The Peshtigo River State Forest in Marinette and Oconto counties has been renamed Governor Earl Peshtigo State Forest according to the Wisconsin Department of Natural Resources. September 25, 2019, as reported in the Appleton Post-Crescent on September 26, 2019.

Personal life and death
Tony Earl married Sheila Rose Coyle of Chicago, in the summer of 1962. They met while he was a student at the University of Chicago Law School.  They had four daughters together, and were married for more than 30 years before separating in 1995. Their divorce was finalized in 2003.  In 2011, Earl married Jane Nemke.

Earl had a stroke on February 19, 2023, and died four days later, on February 23, at the UW Health University Hospital, at the age of 86.

Electoral history

Wisconsin Assembly, Marathon 2nd district (1969, 1970)

| colspan="6" style="text-align:center;background-color: #e9e9e9;"| Special Election, October 7, 1969

| colspan="6" style="text-align:center;background-color: #e9e9e9;"| General Election, November 3, 1970

Wisconsin Assembly, 85th district (1972)

| colspan="6" style="text-align:center;background-color: #e9e9e9;"| General Election, November 7, 1972

Wisconsin Attorney General (1974)

| colspan="6" style="text-align:center;background-color: #e9e9e9;"| Democratic Party Primary, September 10, 1974

Wisconsin Governor (1982, 1986)

| colspan="6" style="text-align:center;background-color: #e9e9e9;"| Democratic Party Primary, September 14, 1982

| colspan="6" style="text-align:center;background-color: #e9e9e9;"| General Election, November 2, 1982

| colspan="6" style="text-align:center;background-color: #e9e9e9;"| Democratic Party Primary, September 9, 1986

| colspan="6" style="text-align:center;background-color: #e9e9e9;"| General Election, November 4, 1986

U.S. Senate (1988)

| colspan="6" style="text-align:center;background-color: #e9e9e9;"| Democratic Party Primary, September 13, 1988

References

External links
 Biography from the National Governors Association

|-

1936 births
2023 deaths
20th-century American lawyers
20th-century American naval officers
20th-century American politicians
Candidates in the 1974 United States elections
Candidates in the 1988 United States elections
Democratic Party governors of Wisconsin
Democratic Party members of the Wisconsin State Assembly
Michigan State University alumni
Military personnel from Michigan
People from St. Ignace, Michigan
Wisconsin lawyers